Events from the year 2008 in the country of Russia.

Incumbents
President: Vladimir Putin (until 8 May), Dmitry Medvedev (from 8 May) 
Prime Minister: Viktor Zubkov (until 8 May), Vladimir Putin (from 8 May) 
Minister of Defence: Anatoliy Serdyukov

Events
 March 2: 2008 Russian presidential election is occurred, Dmitry Medvedev won the election.
 May 7: Dmitry Medvedev becomes President of Russia.
 May 24: Dima Bilan wins the Eurovision Song Contest 2008 in Belgrade, Serbia
 August 7–16: Russia–Georgia war
 August 8–11: Battle of Tskhinvali
 August 9–12: Battle of the Kodori Valley
 August 9/10: Battle off the coast of Abkhazia
 August 9–19: Occupation of Poti
 August 13–22: Occupation of Gori
 February – The Russian group Voina staged the Fuck for the heir Puppy Bear! performance at the Timiryazev State Biological Museum in Moscow to protest at the election of Dmitry Medvedev in the 2008 Russian presidential election.

Births

Deaths

January

January 3 - 
 Aleksandr Abdulov, 54, Russian actor, lung cancer.
 Nikolay Puzanov, 69, Russian Soviet biathlete, 1968 Olympic Gold medalist.

August

August 9 - Denis Vetchinov

September

September 24 - Ruslan Yamadayev, 46, Chechen warlord and member of Russian State Duma, shot.

See also 
 List of Russian films of 2008

References

External links

 
Years of the 21st century in Russia
2000s in Russia